The Bank Restriction Act 1797 was an Act of the Parliament of Great Britain (37 Geo. III. c. 45) which removed the requirement for the Bank of England to convert banknotes into gold. The period lasted until 1821, when convertibility was restored. The period between these two dates is known as the Restriction period.

Reasons for restricting
An increasing number of people were trading their banknotes for gold. Due to the overprinting of banknotes, the Bank of England was losing its supply of gold, and due to the gold standard, the value of each banknote was diminishing. The timing of the act, which had been under consideration for a few months owing to runs on banks in Newcastle-upon-Tyne, Sunderland, and Durham that had in turn requested monetary support from the Bank of England, was the invasion of Britain on 22–24 February 1797 by French forces in Fishguard. When news of this event, now known as the Battle of Fishguard, became known in London, a much greater run on the Bank of England was feared, had a large number of holders of banknotes attempted to convert them into gold when bullion reserves were heavily reduced.  However, because the total face value of the notes in circulation was almost exactly twice the actual gold reserves held (£10,865,050 of notes, compared to £5,322,010 in bullion), this would have bankrupted the Bank, and Parliament decided to suspend these 'specie payments' with immediate effect; this suspension was renewed annually until 1821.

Reasons for overprinting
British banknotes were overprinted by the government of William Pitt the Younger after Britain declared war on revolutionary France in 1793. The Bank Restriction Act released the government from the fear of mass redemption of such convertible banknotes, and by the end of the war in 1814 the banknotes in circulation had a face value of £28.4 million, yet were backed by only £2.2 million of gold. However, by 1821, and with radical economic policies instigated by Sir Robert Peel (the future Prime Minister, acting as Chairman of the Bullion Committee), this situation was reversed, and with £2,295,360 of notes in circulation being backed by £11,233,390 of bullion, the British government resumed "convertibility" on 1 May 1821 (two years ahead of schedule).

In popular culture

After the passing of the act, Richard Brinsley Sheridan publicly bemoaned the way in which the Bank of England had fallen under the influence of William Pitt the Younger by describing the institution as "An elderly lady in the City, of great credit and long standing who had unfortunately fallen into bad company". This in turn led to James Gillray’s famous cartoon entitled Political Ravishment; or the Old Lady of Threadneedle Street in Danger, which depicts Pitt seducing the Bank of England, personified as an old lady attired in £1 and £2 notes, for her fortune. This cartoon is the origin of the Bank's nickname of "The Old Lady of Threadneedle Street", still in use today.

See also

Inflation
Depreciation

Further reading
 Patrick K O'Brien, Nuno Palma, Danger to the Old Lady of Threadneedle Street? The Bank Restriction Act and the regime shift to paper money, 1797–1821, European Review of Economic History

References

1797 in economics
Banking in Great Britain
Banking legislation in the United Kingdom
Great Britain Acts of Parliament 1797